Sir Harold Derbyshire  (25 December 1886 – 14 September 1972) was an English barrister, judge and Liberal Party politician.

Background and education
Derbyshire was born in Cherry Tree, Blackburn, Lancashire, England, the son of James Derbyshire and Elizabeth Kate Chew. He was educated at Queen Elizabeth's Grammar School, Blackburn, and then on a scholarship at Sidney Sussex College, Cambridge, where he studied Natural Sciences. He afterwards gained an LLB. In 1915 he married Dorothea Alice Taylor in Blackburn.

Legal career
Derbyshire was admitted to Gray's Inn, where he was called to the Bar in 1911. He practised on the Northern Circuit and was made a KC in 1928. He was elected a Bencher of Gray's Inn in 1931. From 1933-34 he served as Judge of Appeal in the Isle of Man. From 1934 to 1946 he was Chief Justice at the High Court of Calcutta. In 1948 he was the Inn's Treasurer. He retired from public life in 1950.

Military service
Derbyshire served with distinction during World War I in the Royal Artillery in France and Belgium, and was awarded the MC in the 1918 Birthday Honours.

Political service
In the 1923 General Election he contested the seat of Clitheroe and in the 1929 General Election that of Royton, standing for the Liberal Party, but was unsuccessful on both occasions.

Electoral record

Sources
 Who Was Who, vol. 7: 1971-80. A & C Black and Oxford University Press

References

1886 births
1972 deaths
English barristers
Members of Gray's Inn
20th-century English judges
Chief Justices of the Calcutta High Court
People from Blackburn
Alumni of Sidney Sussex College, Cambridge
Recipients of the Military Cross
People educated at Queen Elizabeth's Grammar School, Blackburn
British India judges
Liberal Party (UK) parliamentary candidates